Nizhneyarkeyevo (Tübänge Yärkäy) is a rural locality (a selo) and the administrative centre of Yunnovsky Selsoviet, Ilishevsky District, Bashkortostan, Russia. The population was 977 as of 2010. There are 40 streets.

Geography 
Nizhneyarkeyevo is located 3 km northeast of Verkhneyarkeyevo (the district's administrative centre) by road. Verkhneyarkeyevo is the nearest rural locality.

References 

Rural localities in Ilishevsky District